Soluta may refer to:

Soluta (echinoderm), an extinct clade of echinoderms
Soluta gramineoides, a beetle in the family Cerambycidae